Vester may refer to:

Places
Vešter, a settlement in the Municipality of Škofja Loka in the Upper Carniola region of Slovenia
Vester Hassing, a Danish town in North Jutland, Denmark

People
Vester Flanagan (1973–2015), American news reporter and murderer
Vester Pegg (1889–1951), American actor of the silent era
Vester R. Wright (1921–1966), American Champion Thoroughbred horse racing trainer
Viestards (?–1230), also known as Vester, Viesthard, Vesthardus, and Viesturs, a Semigallian leader sometimes referred to as King of Semigallia
Frederic Vester (1925–2003), a German biochemist and expert on ecology
Hannah Vester (born 2006), German rhythmic gymnast 
Linda Vester (born 1965), American TV news host
Michael Vester (born 1988), Danish professional football forward
Saskia Vester (born 1959), German actress and author

Other
, a United States Navy patrol vessel and minesweeper in commission from 1917 to 1919
Vester Guitars, a music instrument manufacturer specializing in guitars and guitar amplifiers
Vester (supermarket), a supermarket chain in Kazakhstan